You Can't Ask That is an Australian TV series created by ABC Television that first went to air in August 2016.  its seventh season is on air in Australia.

The series will take a rest in 2023, however is expected to return beyond that.

History
The series was created by Kirk Docker, Aaron Smith and Jon Casimir in 2015, as a spin-off from Hungry Beast. The first episode of the first season aired on ABC TV on 3 August 2016, as well as on  iview.

Its seventh season started airing in May 2022 in Australia.

Description

The show aims to offer insight into the lives of marginalised communities and break down stereotypes while answering the questions people are afraid to ask, reportedly inspired by Ask Me Anything (AMA) threads on Reddit.
Each episode asks controversial questions sourced from the public to a minority Australian population, with the first series including indigenous people, people of short stature, Muslims, sex workers, transgender people and more. Several representative organisations were credited in the series including Short Statured People of Australia, Scarlet Alliance, Alzheimer's Australia and Exit International, as well as The Karuna Hospice Service and Palliative Care NSW.

Season overview
On 28 September 2016, ABC announced the series had been renewed for a second season. On 25 October 2017, ABC announced the series had been renewed for a third season.

Episodes

Season 1 (2016)

Season 2 (2017)

Season 3 (2018)

Season 4 (2019)

Season 5 (2020)

Season 6 (2021)

Season 7 (2022)

Awards and recognition 
You Can't Ask That won the Rose d'Or for Best Reality or Factual Entertainment in 2017.  It also won 3 UN Media Awards for Promotion of Disability Rights and Issues, Promotion of Social Cohesion and Promotion of Empowerment of Older People. In 2018 it was nominated for a Logie for Most Outstanding Factual or Documentary Program.

International versions
In July 2017, Kan 11 in Israel began broadcasting a local version of the series under the name "סליחה על השאלה" (Slicha Al HaShe'ela, Excuse me for asking), with total of 98 episodes in 8 seasons (2 of which are in arabic, and 3 are for kids).

In February 2019, Dutch broadcaster BNNVARA started broadcasting a local version on public broadcasting channel NPO 3 under the title "Ik durf het bijna niet te vragen" (I hardly dare to ask).

In June 2019, CBC Television in Canada released a local version of the series titled You Can't Ask That with eight episodes.

An Arabic language version called "بلا مؤاخذة" (bila muakhadha, No Blame) began airing on 21 September 2019 on the Kan 11's sister channel Makan 33.

In October 2020, a U.S. version of the series was picked up by Current Flow Entertainment. Remake rights were acquired for both English and Spanish language versions.

References

External links
 You Can't Ask That at ABC iview
 Screen bites: can a show like You Can't Ask That change the conversation? on Guardian Australia.
 ABC gives minorities a voice in reality TV show You Can’t Ask That on The Australian.
 The Karuna Hospice Service
 Palliative Care NSW

Australian Broadcasting Corporation original programming
Australian non-fiction web series
Australian non-fiction television series
2010s Australian television series
Australian LGBT-related web series